Givskud is a little town in southern Jutland with a population of 577 (1 January 2022). The town is located in Vejle Municipality in the Region of Southern Denmark. Other than Givskud Church it consisted of only a few farms, a school and a rectory in the 19th century. Later an inn was built. It was not until 1969 that the village really came into public attention. It was that same year that the Givskud Zoo was established under the name Løveparken Givskud ("Givskud Lion Park") and was an innovation among zoos, with visitor being able to roam about with the lions in their own private cars. Later came giraffes, rhinos, bison, and elephants to the park, which today houses more than 100 species. Givskud Zoo is now a huge attraction in Jutland.

References

External links
 Givskud Zoo (in Danish)
 Vejle Kommune (in Danish)
 Homepage for Givskud (in Danish)

Cities and towns in the Region of Southern Denmark
Vejle Municipality